Schizolaena charlotteae is a plant in the family Sarcolaenaceae. It is endemic to Madagascar. The specific epithet is for the botanist Charlotte Rajeriarson of the University of Antananarivo.

Description
Its twigs are glabrous with small lenticels. The subcoriaceous leaves are elliptic to ovate or obovate in shape. The inflorescences bear numerous flowers, each with three sepals and five petals.

Distribution and habitat
Schizolaena charlotteae is known only from the southeastern coastal region of Anosy. Its habitat is lowland humid forest from sea-level to about  altitude.

Threats
Schizolaena charlotteae is currently known only from a single forest, Bemangidy-Ivohibe. The forest is temporarily protected as part of Tsitongambarika New Protected Area, but permanent protection has yet to be granted. The forest is vulnerable to human activity, including illicit harvesting. The preliminary status of the species is Vulnerable.

References

charlotteae
Endemic flora of Madagascar
Plants described in 2014